Arthur Van Branteghem (4 March 1894 – 10 September 1984) was a Belgian racing cyclist. He rode in the 1920 Tour de France.

References

1894 births
1984 deaths
Belgian male cyclists
Place of birth missing